Vadim Abramovich Sidur (28 June 1924, Yekaterinoslav - 26 June 1986, Moscow)  was a Ukrainian Soviet avant-garde sculptor and artist sometimes referred as the Soviet Henry Moore.  Sidur is the creator of a style named Grob-Art (Coffin-Art).  He also left a book of poetry The Happiest Autumn (Самая Счастливая Осень) and a memoir Monuments to the Current State (Памятники Современному Состоянию).

Biography
Sidur was born in Yekaterinoslav (currently Dnipropetrovsk, Ukraine) to a Jewish father and Russian mother. One of the most memorable childhood memories was the events concerned the Holodomor of 1932-1933. Particularly, Vadim Sidur mentions mass mortality from famine in the villages, cases of corpse-eating and cannibalism, and nutrition by surrogates in his autobiographical work "Monument to the Current state". He also talks about the work of the Torgsin system. In particular, his mother exchanged a silver spoon for a kilogram of flour in this shop in Dnipropetrovsk.  In 1942 he was drafted into the Red Army and fought in the battles of World War II near his hometown.  After being wounded in the jaw by a bullet, he was discharged as a disabled veteran.  Sidur abandoned his plans to study medicine and entered Stroganov Moscow State University of Arts and Industry in Moscow instead, where his teachers were G.I. Motovilov and S.L. Rabinovich.  In 1957 he became a member of the Union of Artists of USSR.

During the early period, he created realistic ceramic sculpture.  There were also such works as Heads of the Blinds, Portrait of Ernst Neizvestny cut out of rock 
In 1950s Sidur's art deviated from the official canon, and he completely abandoned it in 1959, developing his own art language.

In the 1960s he produced the sculpture series of Monuments (Монументы), almost all of which are now indeed public monuments in the squares of Russia and the West.  In that work and the related series Disabled (Инвалиды), he tried to condense artistic form to a symbol, a sign, or a formula.

Later he worked on his own philosophy centered around the artist, prophet of future global catastrophes.  An incarnation of this idea in art became his style of Grob-Art, that Sidur saw as a new direction in art.  In 1974 he worked on the book Monuments to the Current State (Памятники Современному Состоянию) that he self-described as a myth.  He also shot an underground movie based on the book.  He worked on sculpture series Man and Woman, Motherhood.  In the 1980s, shortly before his death, he wrote a book of poetry titled The Most Happy Autumn (Самая Счастливая Осень).

Since the 1960s Sidur's works became known in the West.  Soon he became famous.  In the Soviet Union his works were not exhibited from 1950 until his death, with the exception of the one-day exhibition in the House of Writers in Moscow in 1968.  After Sidur's death and with the onset of perestroika, there was established Vadim Sidur's Museum (since 1995 named Moscow State Vadim Sidur's Museum) and the artistic legacy of Sidur was recognized as a national treasure.

References

External links
Museum of Vadim Sidur
Sidur.net

20th-century Russian sculptors
20th-century Russian male artists
Russian male sculptors
Russian male poets
Russian people of Ukrainian descent
Russian avant-garde
Soviet Nonconformist Art
Ukrainian male sculptors
Ukrainian sculptors
1924 births
1986 deaths
20th-century Russian poets
20th-century Russian male writers
Soviet sculptors
Soviet military personnel of World War II
Stroganov Moscow State Academy of Arts and Industry alumni